Justice K. Amareswari (1928–2009) was the first woman judge of the Andhra Pradesh High Court.

Amareswari was born in Appikatla Village in Guntur District. She graduated with a master's degree in Politics and History from Andhra University College of Law in the year 1949. She completed her bachelor's in law from the same university. She became the first lady judge of the Andhra Pradesh High Court. She was a member of the Bar Council from 1960–1961 and was appointed Judge directly from the Bar. She was the Vice-President of the Indian Federation of Women Lawyers. She also worked as the Vice-President of the Andhra Pradesh High Court Advocates Association during the period 1975-1976. In the year 1978 on 29 April she was appointed permanent Judge for Andhra Pradesh High Court.

She died on 25 July 2009, in New Delhi where she had been practising as a senior advocate at the Supreme Court. She is survived by a son and daughter. Chief Minister Y.S. Rajasekhara Reddy and several other political leaders conveyed their condolences to the family members.

References 

20th-century Indian judges
2009 deaths
1928 births
Telugu people
People from Guntur district
Judges of the Andhra Pradesh High Court
Andhra University alumni
Women from Andhra Pradesh
Supreme Court of India lawyers
Women educators from Andhra Pradesh
Educators from Andhra Pradesh
20th-century Indian women judges